Aleknagik Lake is a lake in the U.S. state of Alaska. The village of Aleknagik is on its southeast shore.

Aleknagik is a Yupik word meaning "wrong way home". Yupiks returning to their homes along the Nushagak River would sometimes become lost in the fog and be swept up the Wood River to Aleknagik Lake by the tide.

References

Bodies of water of Dillingham Census Area, Alaska
Lakes of Alaska